Il Politecnico (Italian: The Polytechnic) was an Italian language Communist cultural and literary magazine published in Milan, Italy, between 1945 and 1947. In an editorial in the first issue it was stated that the magazine was inspired by the homonymous journal which had been founded by Carlo Cattaneo in 1839 and published until 1845.

History and profile
Il Politecnico was first published in Milan as a weekly on 29 September 1945. Giulio Einaudi was the publisher, and Elio Vittorini was the editor of the magazine. Franco Fortini, an Italian poet and Marxist theorist, was one of the editorial board members of Il Politecnico. On 1 May 1946 the magazine began to be published monthly.

The idea behind the establishment of Il Politecnico was to rebuild Italian culture after the experience of Fascism. This idea was originally developed by a communist Catholic philosopher Felice Balbo in 1945. Il Politecnico also aimed at providing a democratic forum for literary discussions.

The magazine rejected not to cover the work by non-Communist artists and featured translations of famous authors such as Ernest Hemingway, T. S. Eliot, Franz Kafka and James Joyce. The magazine also published photo-stories of Luigi Crocenzi. Italo Calvino was among the contributors and in fact, he started his career as a journalist in the magazine.

Due to its editorial policy Il Politecnico lost the support of the Communist Party and eventually, ceased publication in December 1947. The 39th issue was the last one which did not announce the closing of the magazine.

See also
 List of magazines in Italy

References

1945 establishments in Italy
1947 disestablishments in Italy
Communist magazines
Cultural magazines
Defunct literary magazines published in Italy
Italian-language magazines
Magazines established in 1945
Magazines disestablished in 1947
Magazines published in Milan
Monthly magazines published in Italy
Weekly magazines published in Italy